Earl of Godolphin was a title in the Peerage of England. It was created in 1706 for Sidney Godolphin, 1st Baron Godolphin, the Lord High Treasurer. At the same time, he was created Viscount Rialton. In 1684 he had already been created Baron Godolphin, of Rialton, also in the Peerage of England. He was a leading politician of the late seventeenth and early eighteenth centuries, a Knight of the Garter and Governor of Scilly. Upon his death in 1712, his titles passed to his only child, Francis.

This 2nd Earl of Godolphin married Henrietta, 2nd Duchess of Marlborough. Their only son, William Godolphin, Marquess of Blandford, was childless and predeceased both his parents. In 1735 the 2nd Earl was created Baron Godolphin, of Helston, in the Peerage of Great Britain, with remainder, in default of male issue of his own, to the male issue of his deceased uncle Henry Godolphin, Dean of St Paul's. When the 2nd Earl died in 1766, the Godolphin earldom, the Rialton viscounty, and the Godolphin barony of 1684 became extinct; but the Godolphin barony of 1735 devolved upon his cousin Francis Godolphin, 2nd Baron Godolphin.

The ancestral seat of the Godolphin family was Godolphin House near Helston in Cornwall. The family took a close interest in mining and a number of mines were founded on their land. At Wheal Vor they experimented with several new inventions (for instance, the Newcomen engine in 1715) to improve the working of their mines.

Earls of Godolphin (1706)
Sidney Godolphin, 1st Earl of Godolphin (1645–1712)
Francis Godolphin, 2nd Earl of Godolphin (1678–1766)
William Godolphin, Marquess of Blandford (c. 1700–1731)

See also
 Baron Godolphin

References

Extinct earldoms in the Peerage of England
 
Noble titles created in 1706
Cornish nobility